Miss World 1986, the 36th edition of the Miss World pageant, was held on 13 November 1986 at the Royal Albert Hall in London, United Kingdom. The winner was Giselle Laronde (Queen of Americas) from Trinidad and Tobago. She was crowned by Miss World 1985, Hólmfríður Karlsdóttir of Iceland. Runner-up was Pia Rosenberg Larsen (Queen of Europe) representing Denmark and third was Chantal Schreiber from Austria.

Results

Placements

Continental Queens of Beauty

Contestants

Judges
Lloyd Honeyghan
Mrs. Arabella
Nick Owen
Robert Coleman
Eric Morley †
Linda Womack
Cecil Womack
Ralph Halpern †
John Lloyd

Notes

Debuts

 
 
  Macau

Returns

Last competed in 1980:
 
Last competed in 1983:
 
 
Last competed in 1984:

Withdrawals
 and  lost its Miss World franchise due to financial assistance issues.

Other Notes
   Turks and Caicos Carmelita Louise Ariza she went to compete in Miss Universe in 1987.it was held in Singapore she placed Top 10.

References

External links
 Pageantopolis – Miss World 1986

Miss World
1986 in London
1986 beauty pageants
Beauty pageants in the United Kingdom
Events at the Royal Albert Hall
November 1986 events in the United Kingdom